Holcopogon bubulcellus is a moth of the family Autostichidae. It is found in southern Europe (from France and the Iberian Peninsula east to southern Russia) and North Africa.

The wingspan is 13–18 mm. The forewings are yellowish grey, sprinkled with blackish scales.

Subspecies
Holcopogon bubulcellus bubulcellus
Holcopogon bubulcellus helveolellus Staudinger, 1879

References

Moths described in 1859
Holcopogon
Moths of Europe
Insects of Turkey